The 1962 United States Senate election in Maryland was held on November 6, 1962. Incumbent Republican U.S. Senator John Marshall Butler did not run for re-election to a third term in office. Democratic U.S. Representative Daniel Brewster won the re-election to succeed him easily over Republican U.S. Representative Edward Tylor Miller.

Republican primary

Candidates
James P. Gleason, former legislative assistant to Senators Richard Nixon and William F. Knowland
Henry J. Laque Jr., perennial candidate
Edward Tylor Miller, U.S. Representative from Easton
Harry L. Simms, real estate broker

Withdrew
Herman L. Mills, former Mayor of Hagerstown

Results

Democratic primary

Candidates
Daniel Brewster, U.S. Representative from Reisterstown
Elbert M. Byrd Jr., professor of government at the University of Maryland
Andrew J. Easter, perennial candidate
Herbert J. Hoover, Civil Engineer, Rockville, MD
Blair Lee III, Delegate from Montgomery County and scion of the Lee family

Results

General election

Results

See also 
 1962 United States Senate elections

References 

Maryland
1962
United States Senate